Tomocyrba is a genus of Malagasy jumping spiders that was first described by Eugène Louis Simon in 1900.

Species
 it contains six species, found only on Madagascar:
Tomocyrba barbata Simon, 1900 – Madagascar
Tomocyrba berniae Szüts & Scharff, 2009 – Madagascar
Tomocyrba decollata Simon, 1900 (type) – Madagascar
Tomocyrba griswoldi Szüts & Scharff, 2009 – Madagascar
Tomocyrba thaleri Szüts & Scharff, 2009 – Madagascar
Tomocyrba ubicki Szüts & Scharff, 2009 – Madagascar

References

External links
 Video of walking Tomocyrba sp.

Further reading

Salticidae genera
Salticidae
Spiders of Africa